R3H domain containing-like is a protein in humans that is encoded by the R3HDML gene.

References

Further reading 

Genes on human chromosome 20